Edward Francis Bouchee (March 7, 1933 – January 23, 2013) was an American professional baseball first baseman.

Early life
Born in Livingston, Montana, Bouchee moved with his family to Spokane, Washington during World War II. He attended Lewis and Clark High School in Spokane, where he was an all-state athlete in football, basketball, and baseball. In high school, Bouchee became longtime friends with future big league pitcher Jack Spring.

Bouchee attended Washington State College, where he played college baseball for the Cougars in 1952.

Baseball career
Following the  season, Bouchee was named NL Sporting News Rookie Player of the Year Award and finished second in NL Rookie of the Year voting, owing to his impressive .293 batting average, with 17 home runs, and 76 runs batted in (RBI). Those would all prove to be career single-season highs for Bouchee. On April 24, 1957, his bases-loaded triple against Bob Friend of the Pittsburgh Pirates allowed pinch runner John Kennedy, the first black player in Phillies' history, to score his only major league run.

On January 17, 1958, Spokane police arrested Bouchee for exposing himself to several young girls. He pleaded guilty to a series of charges, including indecent exposure. Bouchee was sentenced to three years of probation, spent a few months in a psychiatric institution in Connecticut, and then was allowed to return to the Phillies on July 1, 1958.

Bouchee was drafted by the New York Mets from the Cubs in the 1961 Major League Baseball expansion draft. He retired from professional baseball following the 1963 season, having spent most of his last two years in the minor leagues.

Later life
After retiring from baseball at the age of 30, Bouchee moved to Chicago and worked for ACDelco as a warehouse supervisor. He later retired from business, moving to Gilbert, Arizona.

Death
Boucher died in Phoenix, Arizona, on January 23, 2013. His wife Joanne survived him. One of their four children, Chris Bouchee, played minor league baseball in the Phillies farm system, in –.

References

External links

1933 births
2013 deaths
Baseball players from Montana
Philadelphia Phillies players
Chicago Cubs players
New York Mets players
Syracuse Chiefs players
Miami Marlins (IL) players
Spokane Indians players
Buffalo Bisons (minor league) players
Schenectady Blue Jays players
Major League Baseball first basemen
Washington State University alumni
Baseball players from Spokane, Washington
Washington State Cougars baseball players
United States Army personnel of the Korean War
American sportspeople convicted of crimes